Fumigaclavine A dimethylallyltransferase (FgaPT1) is an enzyme with systematic name dimethylallyl-diphosphate:fumigaclavine A dimethylallyltransferase. This enzyme catalyses the following chemical reaction

 fumigaclavine A + dimethylallyl diphosphate  fumigaclavine C + diphosphate

Fumigaclavine C is an ergot alkaloid produced by some fungi of the Trichocomaceae family.

References

External links 

EC 2.5.1